Humphrey Truman (born 5 August 1935) is a British former tennis player.

Raised in Essex, Truman is the elder brother of tennis players Christine Truman and Nell Truman.

During the 1950s and 1960s he competed at Wimbledon, mostly as a doubles player. He made the mixed doubles quarter-finals of the 1959 Wimbledon Championships with sister Christine and featured in the singles main draw twice.

Truman, who was a pilot in the RAF, also played the sport of squash and appeared at the British Open.

References

External links
 
 

1935 births
Living people
British male tennis players
English male tennis players
Tennis people from Essex
English squash players